Khiabani or Khiabany (: "street", "road"); is a Persian language surname which in both of its Latin transcriptions (Khiabani and Khiabany) of the Perso-Arabic alphabet is also common among the Iranian diaspora. Notable people with the surname include:

Khiabany
 Gholam Khiabany,  Iranian-British media scholar

Khiabani
 Javad Khiabani (born 1966), Iranian journalist, football commentator and television show host
 Mohammad Khiabani (1880–1920), Iranian Shia cleric, political leader, and representative to the parliament
 Mohammad Ali Modarres Khiabani (1878–1954), Iranian author, mojtahed and scholar
 Mousa Khiabani (1947–1982), Iranian politician

Persian-language surnames